is a tram station in Kōchi, Kōchi Prefecture, Japan.

History
。
 September 16, 1907 - Opened as a tram stop for Tosa Electric Railway.。
 October 1, 2014 - Tosa Electric Railway merged operations with Tosaden Dream Service and KOCHIKENKOTSU to form Tosaden Traffic. It is now the tram stop for Tosaden Traffic.

Lines
Tosa Electric Railway
Ino Line

Adjacent stations

|-
!colspan=5|Tosa Electric Railway

References

Railway stations in Kōchi Prefecture
Railway stations in Japan opened in 1907